Seethanam is a 1995 Tamil language crime film directed by R. Sundarrajan and produced by T. Siva. The film stars Prabhu, Sangita and Ranjitha. It was released on 24 November 1995.

Plot

After spending many years in jail, Muthu Manikkam is back to his village and wants to take revenge on a corrupt politician Marimuthu. Soon, he clashes with advocate Radha until she knows his tragic past. It is revealed that Muthumanikkam's wife was killed by Marimuthu. In the end, Muthumanikkam kills Marimuthu.

Cast

Prabhu as Muthu Manikkam
Sangita as Dhanalakshmi
Ranjitha as Radha
Mansoor Ali Khan as Marimuthu
R. Sundarrajan as Govindan, Dhanam's father
S. S. Chandran as Varadarajan
Vinu Chakravarthy as Kalimuthu, Radha's father
Prakash Raj as Rajasekhar, Radha's brother
Vichithra as Sarasu
Pandu as Dr. Thandavarayan
Santhana Bharathi
Mohan V. Ram
MRK
Thyagu
Rajasekhar
Balu Anand
Krishnamoorthy
Kovai Senthil
Chelladurai

Soundtrack

The film score and the soundtrack were composed by Deva. The soundtrack, released in 1995, features 7 tracks with lyrics written by R. Sundarrajan.

References

1995 films
Films scored by Deva (composer)
1990s Tamil-language films
Films directed by R. Sundarrajan